Munyonyo Commonwealth Resort is a luxurious Five star hotel-resort in Kampala, the capital and largest city in Uganda, the third-largest economy in the East African Community.

Location
The resort is located in the neighborhood of Munyonyo, in  Makindye Division, in the southeastern part of Kampala, along the northern shores of Lake Victoria, the second-largest freshwater lake in the world. It is located adjacent to Speke Resort and Conference Center. The coordinates of Munyonyo Commonwealth Resort are:0°14'11.0"N, 32°37'25.0"E (Latitude:0.236389; Longitude:32.623611).

Overview
The resort was commissioned in 2007 and served as the host venue of the Commonwealth Heads of Government Meeting 2007 (CHOGM 2007), held from 23 November until 25 November 2007, in Kampala Uganda. Built at an estimated cost of US$30 million (USh60 billion), the Uganda government contributed at least US$7.5 million (USh15 billion) into the joint venture entity that developed the resort. Government spent another US$7 million (USh14 billion) on constructing pathways and widening roads within the complex. The marina was expanded and the security of the infrastructure was updated. The US$7.5 million has been treated as equity by government while the US$7 million was treated as Conference expenses.

Ownership
The hotel is a member of the Ruparelia Group, which includes four other hotels in Kampala. As of July 2014, the hotels of the Ruparelia Group include:

 Speke Resort and Conference Center - Munyonyo, Kampala
 Kampala Speke Hotel - Nile Avenue, Kampala
 Kabira Country Club - Bukoto, Kampala
 Kampala Tourist Hotel - Luwum Street, Kampala

See also

References

External links
 Munyonyo Commonwealth Resort Homepage
 A Lot More To Munyonyo
CHOGM PROBE: Government Has No Shares In Munyonyo Resort - Sudhir

Hotels in Kampala
Makindye Division
Ruparelia Group